Jon M. Sands (born 1956) is the Federal Public Defender for the District of Arizona and has been since 2004.  He served as the chair of the Federal Defender Sentencing Guidelines Committee and chair of the Defender Services Advisory Group. As of 2022, he is co-chair of the Federal Defender Legislative Committee and a member of the Federal Defender Sentencing Guidelines Committee.

Sands graduated magna cum laude from Yale University in 1978, with an undergraduate degree in history. He received a J.D. with honors from the University of California at Davis Law School in 1984. From 1984 through 1985, he was a law clerk for Judge Mary M. Schroeder of the Ninth Circuit Court of Appeals.

Sands currently teaches Criminal Procedure and Advanced Criminal Procedure at the Arizona State University College of Law. Professor Sands has served as Special Counsel to the United States Sentencing Commission, and prior to joining the Federal Public Defender's office, he was with the Phoenix law firm of Meyer, Hendricks, Victor, Osborn, and Maledon.

References

1950s births
Living people
Yale University alumni
UC Davis School of Law alumni
Public defenders